Simon I de Montfort ( 1025 – 25 September 1087) was a French nobleman. He was born in Montfort l'Amaury, in the Duchy of Normandy, and became its lord. He was the son of Amaury I de Montfort and Bertrade.

Progeny
Simon I first married Isabel de Broyes (b. 1034 in Broyes, Marne), daughter of Hugh Bardoul. Their children were:
Amaury II de Montfort (c. 1056 – 1089), lord of Montfort
Isabel (Elizabeth) de Montfort (b. 1057), who married Raoul II de Tosny, a companion of William the Conqueror.

Simon I's second marriage was to Agnes d'Evreux (b. 1030), daughter of Richard, Count of Évreux. Their children were:
 
Bertrade de Montfort (c. 1059 – 1117), became queen of France.
Richard de Montfort (c. 1066 – 1092), lord of Montfort, slain in attack on abbey at Conches.
Simon II de Montfort (c. 1068 – 1104), lord of Montfort
Amaury III de Montfort (c. 1070 – 1137), lord of Montfort and Count of Évreux.
Guillaume de Montfort (c. 1073–1101), bishop of Paris.
Adeliza de Montfort (b. 1075)

References

Sources

Simon
Seigneur of Montfort

1020s births
1087 deaths
Year of birth uncertain